is a Japanese anime producer from Shichinohe, Aomori Prefecture. The project launched as an "animation RPG" for smartphones, considered the first of its kind, and later expand to multiple platforms and media in the future. Hirokazu Hisayuki, Yōhei Sasaki, Shō Matsui, Yukiko Akiyama, and Hisashi Hirai work on the project's character design. The opening song is by iRis and Yumemiru Adolescene.

Formerly a producer at Sunrise Studio 8, Furusato established his own company, Odd Eye Creative, in February 2011.

Works

TV anime 
Mīmu Iro Iro Yume no Tabi (1983) - Production assistant
Mister Ajikko (1988) - Setting production
Brave Exkaiser (1990) - Setting production
The Brave of Sun Fighbird (1991) - Production desk
The Brave Fighter of Legend Da-Garn (1992) - Production desk
The Brave Express Might Gaine (1993) - Production desk
The Brave Police J-Decker (1994) - Production desk
The Brave of Gold Goldran (1995) - Assistant producer
Outlaw Star (1998) - Producer
Angel Links (1999) - Producer
DinoZaurs: The Series (2000) - Project producer
Gear Fighter Dendoh (2000) - Producer
Crush Gear Turbo (2001) - Producer
Machine Robo Rescue (2003) - Producer
My-HiME (2004) - Producer
My-Otome (2005) - Producer
Idolmaster: Xenoglossia (2007) - Producer
The Girl Who Leapt Through Space (2009) - Producer
Phi Brain: Puzzle of God (2011–2013) - Animation producer
Cross Ange (2014) - Project producer
Revue Starlight (2018) - Project cooperation

Movies 
Castle in the Sky (1986) - Production assistant
Crush Gear Turbo the Movie: Kaiservern's Ultimate Challenge (2002) - Producer
Fukkō Ōen Masamune Datenicle Gattaiban+ (2021) - Planning, producer

OVA 
Future GPX Cyber Formula SAGA (1996) - Producer
Future GPX Cyber Formula SIN (1998) - Producer
My-Otome Zwei (2006) - Producer
My-Otome 0: S.ifr (2008) - Producer

Web anime 
 Megohime Animation (2019) - Associate producer

Games 
Xuccess Heaven (2015) - Planning, original creator

Magazine projects 
Megami Magazine: Hōkago no Lucky Risupōn (2019) - Original idea, original creator

References

External links
 
 
 
 

Living people
Japanese television producers
1961 births